Dumle is a brand of chocolate-covered toffees marketed and manufactured by Fazer.

The original sweet consisted of a hard toffee lollipop coated in chocolate, but was not branded Dumle until 1960, possibly as a reference to children's television series , one of the first broadcast on Swedish television.

The manufacturer was acquired by Fazer in 1975, and in 1987 Fazer released a new product with a softer toffee covered in chocolate and packaged in a candy wrapper, which is now named Dumle original.

The brand now contains a range of chocolate-covered caramels and toffees, including a range of chocolates and ice creams. A number of variations and limited editions have been produced, including apple, salty liquorice, mint, gingerbread, mango-orange, cranberries, banana, lime and chocolate-flavoured soft toffees, often with distinguishing colours on their wrappers.

References

External links
Official website

Products introduced in 1945
Products introduced in 1987
Toffee
Brand name confectionery
Finnish confectionery
Swedish confectionery
Fazer